Eva Renate Nesheim Indrevoll (born 30 September 1975 ) is a Norwegian disabled athlete. She competed in the Summer Paralympic Games three times, She has won eight medals in swimming . She was awarded the  Porsgrunds Porselænsfabrik's Honorary Award.

Career 
She competed at the 1992 Summer Paralympic Games, where she won a Gold medal in 50 meters butterfly, Gold medal in 400 meters freestyle, and Silver medal in 100 meters freestyle.

She competed at the 1996 Summer Paralympics, where she won Gold medal in 50 meters butterfly, Gold medal in 200 meters medley, Silver medal in 100 meters backstroke, and Silver medal in 100 meters breaststroke.

She competed at the 2000 Summer Paralympics , where she won a Silver medal in 100 meters backstroke.

She competed at the 1994 IPC Swimming World Championships in Malta.

References

External links 

 Eva Renate Nesheim Indrevoll Fotograf Arnfinn Johnsen as

1975 births
Living people
Sportspeople from Stavanger
Paralympic swimmers of Norway
S7-classified Paralympic swimmers
Norwegian female freestyle swimmers
Norwegian female backstroke swimmers
Norwegian female breaststroke swimmers
Norwegian female butterfly swimmers
Norwegian female medley swimmers
Swimmers at the 1992 Summer Paralympics
Swimmers at the 1996 Summer Paralympics
Medalists at the 1992 Summer Paralympics
Medalists at the 1996 Summer Paralympics
Paralympic gold medalists for Norway
Paralympic silver medalists for Norway
Medalists at the World Para Swimming Championships